A great number of words of French origin have entered the Persian language since the early modern period. The following is a partial list of these loanwords:

See also

 Persian vocabulary
 Francisation
 France–Iran relations

References 
 Petit Larousse in Persian, edited by Hedayat Alah Ghatan, 1967.
 Collins French English Dictionary © HarperCollins Publishers 2005.
 Persian English Dictionary, S. Haim, Hippocrene Books 2002.

External links
 

Lists of loanwords
France–Iran relations
Persian words and phrases
Persian words similar to other languages
French language in Asia